Baron Wolfgang von Strucker is a supervillain appearing in American comic books published by Marvel Comics. A former Nazi officer, he is one of the leaders of the Hydra terrorist organization and an enemy of S.H.I.E.L.D., the Avengers, and the interests of the United States, and thus a fugitive. He has been physically augmented to be nearly ageless. While Strucker has been seemingly killed in the past, he returned to plague the world with schemes of world domination and genocide, time and time again.

The character appeared in several media adaptations, including television series and video games. Strucker has been portrayed by Campbell Lane in the 1998 TV film, Nick Fury: Agent of S.H.I.E.L.D., by Thomas Kretschmann in the Marvel Cinematic Universe films Captain America: The Winter Soldier (2014) and Avengers: Age of Ultron (2015), and by Joey Defore as a teenager in the television series Agents of S.H.I.E.L.D., also set in the Marvel Cinematic Universe.

Publication history
Created by Stan Lee and Jack Kirby, the character first appears in Sgt. Fury and his Howling Commandos #5 (1964).

Fictional character biography
Born in the late 19th century to a Prussian noble family who had relocated to Strucker Castle in Bavaria following the Franco-Prussian War, Wolfgang von Strucker became a Heidelberg fencing champion and was disfigured by facial scars.

Strucker fought for Germany during World War I, during which he first encountered the jewel "Momentary Princess", which was fated to appear and disappear at regular intervals of time. Wolfgang pursued the jewel in the decades that followed.

When Adolf Hitler rose to power in Germany in 1933, Baron Strucker joined the Nazi Party, becoming infamous in the following years. In 1936, he and Geist, one of Hitler's top men, allied themselves with the Egyptian mentalist Amahl Farouk (secretly the Shadow King) in an attempt to dispute the lineage of England's royal family and install a new king who would be sympathetic to the Nazis. Their plot was thwarted by the Canadian adventurer Logan and the time-traveling members of Excalibur, Kitty Pryde and Phoenix.

In 1937, German Intelligence agent Strucker was sent to the United States to assassinate Senator Fulton, but he was foiled by brigand-for-hire Dominic Fortune.

World War II
As World War II began, Strucker was appointed wing commander of the Death's Head Squadron by Hitler, and, in 1941, he was sent to Madripoor to help the Hand ninja cult transform young Natasha Romanova into their master assassin, only to be defeated by Logan (yet to acquire the adamantium skeleton which would transform into Wolverine), Captain America, and Ivan Petrovitch. Later in 1941, Strucker invaded Latveria, seeking to use the Sturm-Fånger ("Storm-Catcher") to control cosmic energies; the device was wrecked by time-traveling members of X-Force.

After the United States entered the war, the First Attack Squad of Able Company (the Howling Commandos) became a constant thorn in the Nazis' side, and Hitler turned to Strucker, ordering him to publicly humiliate the Howlers' leader Nick Fury. Strucker challenged Fury to a duel on the island of Norsehaven, and Fury violated direct orders to meet Strucker and satisfy his pride. Before their duel with plywood swords, Strucker offered Fury a toast, and secretly drugged Fury's drink. As they fought, Strucker was surprised to find that despite his superior swordsmanship and the effects of the drug, Fury was a tenacious foe, but Fury finally succumbed to the drug's effects. Strucker had the event recorded and sent back to Germany as propaganda material to destroy Fury's reputation.

Hitler demanded that Strucker capture the Howlers so they could be executed in Berlin. Strucker assembled the Blitzkrieg Squad, who could match each of the Howlers skill for skill, but the Howlers defeated them at every turn. Strucker also led the Blitzkrieg Squad to England to assassinate Prime Minister Winston Churchill and Field Marshal Bernard Law Montgomery, but they were foiled by the Invaders. Strucker finally abandoned the Blitzkrieg Squad, which was later led by Colonel Klaue.

While vacationing in Berlin, Strucker witnessed the Asgardian Thor's attack on the Chancellery, after which Strucker followed a bandaged man through a portal in space. Realizing he had traveled decades into the future, Strucker stole some history books about the end of World War II. He encountered the time machine's creator Doctor Doom, who allowed him to return to the past, not believing that Strucker could win the war even with the knowledge he had obtained.

Tiring of Strucker's failures, Hitler assigned him to topple the resistance in the French town of Cherbeaux, or else destroy the town. Strucker rounded up the resistance to send them to camps to avoid having to destroy the town, but the Howling Commandos derailed his train, freeing the captives. Hitler demanded that Strucker destroy the town, and Strucker set the explosives, but then came face-to-face with Fury, who had rigged an explosive powerful enough to kill Strucker. Caught in a stalemate, Strucker agreed to let the people of Cherbeaux evacuate so that he and Fury could battle again. When the evacuation was complete, Strucker and Fury fought while Cherbeaux was destroyed around them, and Fury lost Strucker in the upheaval. For allowing the evacuation of Cherbeaux, Hitler had Strucker marked for death by the Gestapo.

Strucker escaped Germany because of the Red Skull, Hitler's right-hand man, who foresaw Hitler's fall, and wanted an alternative power base. The Red Skull sent Strucker to Japan to form this organization, but Strucker intended to run it for himself. In Japan, Strucker joined forces with the Hand and an underground subversive movement which later became Hydra where he received help from Arnim Zola into establishing it. Strucker was instrumental in Hydra's earliest raids on war plants to supply their troops, and finally confronted the Supreme Hydra, claiming that as the organization's true mastermind, he should be Hydra's leader. The Supreme Hydra refused and shot him, but Strucker had worn a bulletproof vest, and slew the Supreme Hydra, claiming his title. Strucker also slew the jonin (leader) of the Hand in single combat, severing ties with the Hand to prevent Hydra agents from being seduced by promises of the dark power of the demonic Beast of the Hand.

Strucker moved Hydra's operations to a private island in the Pacific, named Hydra Island. After he used an undetectable "phantom" submarine to assault allied and Japanese ships, Hydra Island was investigated by the allies' Captain Savage and his Leatherneck Raiders, and the Japanese Samurai Squad. Captain Savage and the others managed to overcome Hydra's forces, and Strucker was forced to detonate the island. With Hydra's plans temporarily waylaid, Strucker was forced to return to Germany.

To regain Hitler's favor, Strucker subjected Fury to a hallucinogenic drug in Africa, offering the formula to Hitler if it proved successful in the field. Fury was overcome by the hallucinations, but the Howlers rescued him, enabling his recovery. Ever more uncomfortable with the progress of the war, Strucker continued to operate Hydra from the shadows while pretending to be a loyal Nazi, secretly funneling Hitler's resources into his own operation. He also obtained the Dragon of Death, a powerful Japanese submarine, and made it Hydra's new mobile headquarters. Using his knowledge of the future, Strucker attempted to complete Uranverein, a nuclear weapons project, before the United States, sending Hydra agents to obtain the materials. Learning of this plot, the Invaders ultimately scuttled the Dragon, again delaying Strucker's plans, and during the clash Strucker lost the books he had brought from the future. It is also likely that because of this scheme that Strucker inadvertently caused a bootstrap paradox that lead to the establishment of the United States' Manhattan Project which builds the atomic bombs and the eventual nuclear proliferation in the first place.

In 1944, Strucker encountered the Gnobians, a benevolent race of empathic extraterrestrials who had crashed near Gruenstadt. Realizing what their technology could do for Hydra, Strucker befriended the naïve creatures and killed the population of Gruenstadt to cover his tracks. The Howlers arrived, too late to prevent the tragedy, but fatally wounded Strucker. The Gnobians healed Strucker with their powers, but they went insane from absorbing some of his hate-filled psyche in the process. Strucker fled their crashed ship, taking discs of their information to his scientists. As Germany fell in 1945, Strucker had the Nazis' two greatest superhumans Master Man and Warrior Woman placed into suspended animation in opposite sides of Berlin to await later revival. Strucker also gave the Red Skull the gas used to preserve them, and it also preserved the Skull when he was buried alive in his bunker during a battle with Captain America.

Avoiding prosecution for war crimes, Baron Strucker had his scientists provide him with age-retarding serum so he could personally oversee Hydra's progress for decades to come. He and the Baroness Adelicia Von Krupp once captured the CIA's Agent Ten, who proved to be Strucker's old enemy Logan, but Logan was rescued by CIA agents Richard and Mary Parker. Needing more finances for Hydra, Strucker abducted Gabrielle Haller, who had a map leading to a fortune in lost Nazi gold hidden within her mind, but Haller was defended by her friends, the mutants Charles Xavier and Erik Magnus, and Magnus took the gold for his own purposes.

Strucker married more than once in the years that followed resulting in a son named Werner, who resisted his father's influence, and twins Andrea and Andreas, who were genetically altered by Hydra scientists and so, developed super powers later in life. Strucker rebuilt Hydra Island, but concealed his role in the organization by using a front called "THEM", in which he was Grand Imperator. In this role, he assigned Arnold Brown to be his Imperial Hydra, supposedly the true master of Hydra. Brown's rule of Hydra ended when he was overcome by S.H.I.E.L.D., an espionage organization led by Nick Fury and designed to thwart Hydra, and the unmasked Brown was mistakenly shot by his own men as Hydra crumbled about him. THEM also found and revived the long-lost Red Skull, but Strucker finally abandoned THEM when the scientific research arm of Hydra and another branch splintered away to become A.I.M. and the Secret Empire, respectively.

Death
Strucker continued to conceal his identity, acting as Don Antonio Caballero, Emir Ali Bey, and S.H.I.E.L.D. agent John Bronson. He finally revealed himself as Hydra's true leader when he prepared to unleash the Death Spore bomb from Hydra Island. Invading the island, Nick Fury used masks to trick Strucker's men into shooting their leader. In a panic, Strucker ran into a chamber where nuclear processes were taking place, and was immediately incinerated. Soon afterwards, Fury set the Death Spore bomb to explode within Hydra Island's protective dome designed to keep the island safe from the spores, eradicating all Hydra personnel within.

Life Model Decoy
In the ensuing years, the roboticist Machinesmith built a robot duplicate of Strucker, using it to test the abilities and morality of Captain America. The robot fooled even S.H.I.E.L.D. into thinking they had captured the real Strucker. Strucker also lived on in the form of several different android LMDs (Life Model Decoy) based on his mind; one was activated on Hydra Island after Strucker's death and believed itself to be the true Strucker, finally meeting its doom battling Captain America, Fury, and the one-time Howling Commandos. Another tricked Canada's Department H into selling Hydra the battle-suit worn by their hero Guardian. The most destructive was the Deltite, an LMD Strucker had planted within S.H.I.E.L.D. to tear the organization apart, and ultimately wound up running S.H.I.E.L.D. and Hydra simultaneously, playing the two against each other. By the time the Deltite was finally revealed and destroyed, it had managed to sow distrust throughout S.H.I.E.L.D., and killed many agents, leading Fury to disband the organization.

Resurrection
Hydra suffered without Strucker's leadership, and the Red Skull championed an effort to bring the Baron back, providing a distraction to occupy Fury's newly-rebuilt S.H.I.E.L.D. while Hydra scientists found Strucker's body and sacrificed their lives to revive him with the Death Spore bonded to his form.

Thunderbolts
Strucker places the hero Abner Jenkins of the Thunderbolts into his debt by funding his team, and pits the team against threats he helped fund, including the Wrecking Crew, Fathom Five, and the Great Game.

Gorgon and Elsbeth stage a coup of Hydra and kill Strucker. This Strucker was subsequently revealed to be a clone, as the real Strucker was rescued and kept in stasis before being freed by the Swordsman (who turned out to be his son, Andreas) and then Baron Helmut Zemo. Strucker agreed to work with Zemo in his grand plan to take over the world and left together. Helmut Zemo is also responsible for the murder of Strucker's daughter Andrea.

Secret Invasion
During the "Secret Invasion" storyline, Strucker is attacked by Skrulls who are attempting to take over Hydra. However, he is able to defeat them and destroys his own headquarters in order to eliminate any remaining invaders. Strucker also reveals that he no longer adheres to orthodox Nazi beliefs, since he does not wish to "cleanse" the world, but simply to rule it.

Dark Reign
During the "Dark Reign" storyline, Strucker's longtime nemesis, Nick Fury, discovers that S.H.I.E.L.D. is, and always has been, controlled by Hydra. Strucker seems happy finding this out saying that "We've been dancing to the melody for so long, and finally you hear it too". Strucker calls forth all Hydra leaders (Kraken, Viper, Madame Hydra, and Hive), and resurrects the Gorgon for the purpose of "letting the world become aware of Hydra's true nature". However, Nick Fury was interfering in von Strucker's plans, so Strucker enlists the help of Norman Osborn, director of the corrupt H.A.M.M.E.R. agency, to take care of his nemesis. The news that Osborn had recently murdered his son Andreas had little impact on Strucker, who calmly declared that he now owed Osborn "two favors".

It is revealed that, at some point in the past, Baron Strucker, Nick Fury, and Hand grandmaster Soji Soma had a meeting with representatives of the organization Leviathan.

Along with Nick Fury, Baron Strucker was captured by the Kraken. It was revealed that not only was Kraken really Nick Fury's presumably dead half-brother Jake Fury (working with Nick the entire time), but it was revealed to a disbelieving Strucker that in fact S.H.I.E.L.D. had been controlling Hydra all along. Before being able to speak his final words, Nick Fury shot him in the head.

All-New, All-Different Marvel
As part of the All-New, All-Different Marvel branding, Strucker eventually emerges alive minus an eye and replaced with a prosthetic lens. He is described as no longer being Hydra's leader, though shown to still be heavily involved in international subversive dealings. In addition, a revived Andrea and Andreas mentioned that their father "took care" of their return from the dead when they were asked how they were revived.

After the defeat of the Secret Empire, Strucker is given praise as a national hero for leading the defeat of multiple Hydra splinter groups. He also appears as a member of the Power Elite.

Powers and abilities
Baron Strucker is a highly intelligent man in peak human physical condition. He is an exceptional hand-to-hand combatant, swordsman, and marksman. He is also a consummate military strategist and spy, and a master of disguise and excellent actor. He carries a sword and traditional firearms, but also wears the Satan Claw on his right hand: this metal gauntlet amplifies his strength and emits powerful electrical shocks. Strucker also uses serums developed by Hydra, enabling him to maintain his physical vigor at its height and retard his aging process, so that physically he remains the same, despite his advanced age.

Exposure to his Death Spore has bonded Strucker's DNA with the Death Spore, enabling him to be revived after seemingly being killed by gunshot wounds and radiation poisoning. Strucker can now release the Death Spore virus from his body at will, killing his victims nearly instantly. If Strucker is killed, the Death Spore viruses will allegedly be set free from his body and risk infecting the entire Earth.

Baron Strucker's children
 Andrea von Strucker - Baron Strucker's daughter, twin sister of Andreas, and half-sister of Werner. Killed by Baron Helmut Zemo. An apparent clone of Andrea was created by Arnim Zola, but was murdered by Bullseye.
 Andreas von Strucker - Baron Strucker's son, twin brother of Andrea, and half-brother of Werner. Killed by Norman Osborn.
 Werner von Strucker - Baron Strucker's oldest son and half-brother of Andrea and Andreas. Killed by Baron Strucker.

Other versions

Earth-Charnel
A sixth Baron Strucker was the dictator of Earth-9939 (Earth-Charnel) under the name Charnel. He was depicted as a necromantic, cybernetic monster who took over that Earth and created demon-drones called Spawn of Charnel to do his bidding. He was responsible for wiping out most of its heroes there. He paralyzed Thing, turned Mister Fantastic into putty, and destroyed Thor's people. However, Charnel along with his timeline was later destroyed by the bounty-hunter Death's Head.

This universe was used by Advanced Idea Mechanics Supreme Scientist Monica Rappaccini to conceal her hidden base until Hank Pym disrupted her machines, stranding her and her followers on Earth-Charnel.

Marvel Mangaverse
In the Marvel Mangaverse, Strucker was a leader of Hydra, as well as a powerful wizard. He attacked Stark Island and summoned Dormammu by using Tony Stark's gate to the Negative Zone. After that, Strucker was attacked and killed by Doctor Strange in a magical duel.

Marvel Noir
In the Marvel Noir universe, Baron Strucker is the second in command for Baron Zemo.

Old Man Logan
In the pages of "Avengers of the Wastelands" which takes place on Earth-21923 and serve as a sequel to "Old Man Logan", Baron Strucker was among the villains that helped to kill the superheroes. Some years later, Baron Strucker reformed Hydra. He plotted to take over the territories that Doctor Doom rules over only for Doctor Doom to attack first which led to the death of Baron Strucker and the annihilation of Hydra.

The Avengers: United They Stand
Baron Strucker and Hydra appear in The Avengers: United They Stand #2.

In other media

Television
 Baron Strucker appears in The Avengers: Earth's Mightiest Heroes, voiced by Jim Ward.
 Baron Strucker appears in The Super Hero Squad Show episode "Brouhaha at the World’s Bottom!", voiced by Rob Paulsen.
 Baron Strucker appears in the Lego Marvel Super Heroes: Avengers Reassembled, voiced by John Paul Karliak.
 Baron Strucker appears in Avengers Assemble, voiced by Robin Atkin Downes.

Film
 Baron Strucker appeared in the television film Nick Fury: Agent of S.H.I.E.L.D., portrayed by Campbell Lane.
 J. M. DeMatteis wrote a film treatment for a Daredevil film, which included Baron Strucker as the leader of Hydra, an international arms cartel.

Marvel Cinematic Universe
Baron Strucker appeared in live-action media set in the Marvel Cinematic Universe.
 Strucker first appears in a mid-credits scene of the film Captain America: The Winter Soldier, portrayed by Thomas Kretschmann. Based in a Sokovian compound, he leads a Hydra cell in conducting experiments meant to create superhumans using Loki's scepter.
 Strucker returns in the film Avengers: Age of Ultron, with Kretschmann reprising the role. After the Avengers discover and raid his compound, Strucker is defeated by Steve Rogers and transferred to NATO's custody. Following this, Ultron kills Strucker.
 A younger Strucker appears in the TV series Agents of S.H.I.E.L.D. episode "Rise and Shine", portrayed by Joey Defore. In his youth, he was predetermined to lead Hydra and attended Hydra Academy.

Video games
 Baron Strucker appears as a boss in Captain America: Super Soldier, voiced by Kai Wulff.
 Baron Strucker appears as a recurring boss in Marvel: Avengers Alliance.
 Baron Strucker appears as a playable character in Lego Marvel's Avengers.
 Baron Strucker appears as a boss in Marvel: Avengers Alliance 2.

References

External links
 Baron Strucker at Marvel.Com
 

Characters created by Jack Kirby
Characters created by Stan Lee
Comics characters introduced in 1964
Fictional Baltic-German people
Fictional barons and baronesses
Fictional characters from Bavaria
Fictional mass murderers
Fictional military strategists
Fictional Nazi fugitives
Fictional people from the 19th-century
Fictional people from the 20th-century
Fictional private military members
Fictional World War I veterans
Hydra (comics) agents
Marvel Comics characters with accelerated healing
Marvel Comics mutates
Marvel Comics Nazis
Marvel Comics supervillains
Time travelers
Villains in animated television series